Knowlarity Communications is a cloud telephony and AI company headquartered in Singapore. The company provides cloud-based customer service and sales call handling to businesses in Southeast Asia, South Asia, and the Middle East. Knowlarity has over 15,000 customers spread across 65 countries and is the largest cloud communications provider in Southeast Asia and the Middle East.

Knowlarity services are built around its flagship cloud-based telephony platform, Vagent.in, which replaces physical PBX systems with ‘plug-and-play’ telephony system that allows businesses to put in place professional call handling for internal and external communications.

Knowlarity services were shut down in June 2016 by a telco in Delhi.

History
Knowlarity was founded in 2009 by Ambarish Gupta and Pallav Pandey.

Founder and former CEO Ambarish Gupta is a graduate of Computer Science from IIT Kanpur. He started his career at the Fraunhofer Institute for Computer Graphics in Germany before joining software major EFI.

Ambarish later earned an MBA from Carnegie Mellon University and worked as a Senior Associate with McKinsey & Company.

In 2009, drawn to the emerging field of cloud telephony, Ambarish launched Knowlarity Communications with the aim of providing cloud communication to businesses.

Initially headquartered in Gurgaon, India, Knowlarity shifted its headquarters to Singapore in 2013. Today, Knowlarity employs over 300 people at various locations across the world and is the largest provider of cloud-based communications to businesses in Southeast Asia and the Middle East.

Funding 
 As of December 2016, Knowlarity has received over $42.5 million in funding, with the latest round (Series C) raising $20 million from several investors including Delta Partners, Sequoia India, Mayfield, Blacksoil, and Trifecta Capital.
 In 2012's Series A of fundraising, Sequoia Capital invested $6.5 million. Series B ($1 million) took place in 2014, with Sequoia Capital and Mayfield Fund participating.

Acquisition
 In 2014, Knowlarity carried out its first acquisition, that of Delhi-based cloud telephony startup Unicom Techlabs Pvt. Ltd The deal saw Knowlarity take over Unicom Techlabs’ 200 customers in the SMB, e-commerce, real estate, healthcare, education and media sectors.
 In 2016, Knowlarity acquired customer engagement platform Smartwards. The acquisition saw Knowlarity absorb Smartwards’ team into its own operations, with CEO Shantanu Mathur taking over as Country Manager, India.
 In 2018, Knowlarity acquires cloud telephony business of Sunoray Solutions.

References all in one 

Companies based in Haryana
2009 establishments in Haryana
Indian companies established in 2009
Telecommunications companies of Singapore